Romanesco broccoli (also known as broccolo romanesco, romanesque cauliflower,  romanesco or broccoflower) is an edible flower bud of the species Brassica oleracea, which also includes regular broccoli and cauliflower. It is chartreuse in color, and has a form naturally approximating a fractal. Romanesco broccoli has a nutty flavor and a firmer texture than regular broccoli when cooked.

Description

Romanesco superficially resembles a cauliflower, but it is chartreuse in color, with the form of a natural fractal. Nutritionally, romanesco is rich in vitamin C, vitamin K, dietary fiber, and carotenoids.

Fractal structure 

The inflorescence (the bud) is self-similar in character, with the branched meristems making up a logarithmic spiral, giving a form approximating a natural fractal; each bud is composed of a series of smaller buds, all arranged in yet another logarithmic spiral. This self-similar pattern continues at smaller levels. The pattern is only an approximate fractal since the pattern eventually terminates when the feature size becomes sufficiently small. The number of spirals on the head of Romanesco broccoli is a Fibonacci number. 

The causes of its differences in appearance from the normal cauliflower and broccoli have been modeled as an extension of the preinfloresence stage of bud growth. A 2021 paper has ascribed this phenomenon to perturbations of floral gene networks that causes the development of meristems into flowers to fail, but instead to repeat itself in a self-similar way.

See also
Phyllotaxis

References

External links

 

 Fractal Food: Self-Similarity on the Supermarket Shelf (John Walker, March 2005)
 Procedural fractal 3-D generation of Romanesco broccoli with RenderMan (Aleksandar Rodić, 2009)

Brassica oleracea
Fractals
Inflorescence vegetables

de:Blumenkohl#Formen und Typen